Kota Belud (Pha̍k-fa-sṳ: Kú-tá Mâu-lu̍t) is the capital of the Kota Belud District in the West Coast Division of Sabah, Malaysia. Its population was estimated to be around 8,392 in 2010. It is roughly at the midpoint of the federal highway connecting the state capital, Kota Kinabalu, and Kudat, near the northern tip of Sabah. The town is considered as the unofficial capital and gateway to the heartland of the West Coast Bajau people.

Kota Belud's population is divided between the Bajau-Sama, Dusun and Illanun peoples. There is a Chinese minority, which consists mainly of Hakkas. It is noted for its open air market, or tamu, which is held every Sunday. Once a year, the tamu is held on a much larger scale. During this time, it is known as the Tamu Besar or Grand Market.

Gallery

References

External links 

Kota Belud District
Towns in Sabah